William K. Thierfelder is an American businessman, academic administrator, and former athlete, serving as the 20th president of Belmont Abbey College since 2004.

Early life and career 
William K. Thierfelder was born in Manhattan and raised in the Bronx where his father, William P. Thierfelder, was Vice President of the New York Yankees. He holds a Bachelor of Arts in psychology from the University of Maryland and both a master's degree and a doctoral degree in sports psychology and human movement from Boston University. He is a licensed psychologist, a two-time NCAA Division I All-American, a former NCAA Division I coach, and a former member of the United States Olympic Committee's Sports Psychology Registry. He was an Olympian, but did not compete due to an injury.

Prior to his selection as the 20th President of Belmont Abbey College, Thierfelder served as President of the York Barbell Company in York, Pennsylvania. He has also served as the Executive Director of the Player Management Group, LLC; National Director of Sport Science at NovaCare; and was the founder and President of ProSportDoc, Inc. Thierfelder is a former certified member of the National Strength and Conditioning Association as well as the American College of Sports Medicine. He is a member of the American Psychological Association and has previously served as an adjunct Professor of Surgery for Penn State University's Milton S. Hershey College of Medicine.

In 2007, Dr. Thierfelder was named Boston University School of Education's Alumnus of the Year; he was inducted into the Sports Faith International Hall of Fame in 2011. He is a Knight of the Sovereign Military Order of Malta and is the author of Less Than A Minute To Go: The Secret To World-Class Performance in Sport, Business and Everyday Life. He and his wife, Mary, and their ten children, live outside Charlotte, North Carolina.

Controversies

Employer-sponsored contraceptive mandate 
Dr. Thierfelder's leadership of Belmont Abbey College has been marked by controversy, specifically related to issues of implementation regarding the Affordable Care Act. In 2011, the college under his leadership filed a lawsuit against the Obama administration, arguing that its mandated coverage of contraceptives for employees participating in employer-sponsored healthcare violated the college's right to religious liberty. The lawsuit was a source of division for the campus, with many students and faculty members both in favor of the measure and opposed. Those opposed argued that Belmont Abbey College had never been a particularly religious institution, since many of its faculty members and administrators came from non-Catholic backgrounds. Those in favor of the lawsuit argued that the college's roots as a monastery, with a Catholic basilica on the main campus, were indicators that its faith tradition and daily operations were deeply rooted in Catholicism.

As filed, the original lawsuit was dismissed by a federal judge in 2012 due to the Obama administration's failure, at that point in time, to add and clarify religious exemptions to specific parts of the Affordable Care Act and its coverage mandates. Further, U.S. District Judge James Boasberg wrote in his decision at the time that "Belmont’s injury is too speculative to confer standing and that the case is also not ripe for decision.” Belmont Abbey College refiled the lawsuit in late 2013, after the Obama administration granted religious exemptions to another religious institution.

LGBT policy 
In 2016, the college, along with other religious colleges and universities throughout the United States came under increasing criticism from LGBT advocates for refusing to implement policies advocating lesbian, gay, bisexual, and transgender behaviors. Belmont Abbey College argued that its status as a primarily Catholic institution was in conflict with these policies. In a statement, the college claimed that such recognition and approval of LGBT behavior would "abdicate the responsibility of the college community as a whole to act in accord with its fundamental identity as a community which publicly identifies itself as in communion with the Catholic Church."

References

Year of birth missing (living people)
Living people
American Roman Catholics
Heads of universities and colleges in the United States
Belmont Abbey College people
Boston University alumni
University System of Maryland alumni
Businesspeople from New York City